Cyclotrichium is a genus of plants in the  Lamiaceae, first described as a genus in 1953. The entire genus is endemic to southwestern Asia (Iran, Iraq, Turkey, Syria, Lebanon).

Species
Cyclotrichium depauperatum (Bunge) Manden. & Scheng. - western Iran
Cyclotrichium glabrescens (Boiss. ex Rech.f.) Leblebici - southeastern Turkey
Cyclotrichium haussknechtii (Bunge) Manden. & Scheng. - western Iran
Cyclotrichium leucotrichum (Stapf ex Rech.f.) Leblebici - Iran, Iraq, Turkey
Cyclotrichium longiflorum Leblebici - Iran, Iraq, Turkey
Cyclotrichium niveum (Boiss.) Manden. & Scheng - eastern Turkey
Cyclotrichium origanifolium (Labill.) Manden. & Scheng. - Lebanon, Syria, southern Turkey
Cyclotrichium stamineum (Boiss. & Hohen.) Manden. & Scheng. - Iraq, Turkey
Cyclotrichium straussii (Bornm.) Rech.f. - western Iran

References

Lamiaceae
Lamiaceae genera
Taxa named by Pierre Edmond Boissier
Taxa named by Ida P. Mandenova
Flora of Turkey
Flora of Iran
Flora of Iraq
Flora of Syria
Flora of Lebanon